Paraspilarctia klapperichi is a moth of the family Erebidae. It was described by Franz Daniel in 1943. It is found in China.

References

Spilosomina
Moths described in 1943
Moths of Asia